Pettibone Farm is a historic farm on Old Cheshire Road north of the junction with Nobodys Road in Lanesborough, Massachusetts.  Developed beginning in the late 1780s, it represents a well-preserved 19th-century rural farm complex, with a long history of ownership by a single family.  The farm complex, including the farmhouse and a number of mostly 19th century outbuildings, was listed on the National Register of Historic Places in 1991.  It is now the home of Camp Mohawk, a summer camp.

Description and history
Pettibone Farm is located in eastern Lanesborough, with most of its  located between Old Cheshire Road and Chesire Reservoir.  The centerpiece of the property is the farmhouse, which was built by Jonathan Pettibone, and went through numerous alterations in the 19th century, albeit without sacrificing much of its original Georgian and Federal period character.  Located near the house are two 19th-century barns, whose exteriors have been only minimally altered, while the interiors have been adapted for summer camp functions.

It was the farmstead of Jonathan Pettibone, a leader of Lanesborough during the American Revolution.  Pettibone purchased the property in 1768, and the present farmhouse was built about 1789, either by him or his son Amos, who took over the farm.  It remained in the Pettibone family until 1865, when it was sold to Ira Jenks.  The Jenks family owned it into the 20th century, when, after a succession of owners, it was acquired by the Schulman family.  The Schulmans operate Camp Mohawk on the property.

See also
National Register of Historic Places listings in Berkshire County, Massachusetts

References

External links
Camp Mohawk

Historic districts on the National Register of Historic Places in Massachusetts
National Register of Historic Places in Berkshire County, Massachusetts
Farms on the National Register of Historic Places in Massachusetts
Lanesborough, Massachusetts